The Crime Thriller Awards is a British awards ceremony dedicated to crime thriller fiction. The inaugural event was held on 3 October 2008 at the Grosvenor Hotel, hosted by comedian and Jonathan Creek actor Alan Davies. It was televised on ITV3 on 6 October, produced by Cactus TV. The ceremony was preceded by seven weeks of crime-thriller-related programming on ITV3.

In 2009, the awards were merged with the Daggers, the awards presented by the Crime Writers' Association. A second "crime thriller season" was broadcast over six weeks on ITV3 before the awards were presented on 21 October. The 2009 ceremony was sponsored by the high street optician chain Specsavers.

The 2010 and 2011 awards ceremonies were presented by Marcus Brigstocke. Since 2012, Bradley Walsh has hosted the awards.

2008 awards 
 Host: Alan Davies
 Ceremony date: 3 October 2008
 Broadcast date: 6 October 2008

2009 awards 
 Host: Alan Davies
 Ceremony date: 21 October 2009
 Broadcast date: 27 October 2009

2010 awards 
Host: Marcus Brigstocke

2011 awards 
Host: Marcus Brigstocke

2012 awards 
Host: Bradley Walsh

2013 awards 
Host: Bradley Walsh

{| class="wikitable" width="100%"
|-
|+ 2013 awards
|-
! width="50%" | The Film Dagger
! width="50%" | ITV3 Crime Thriller Living Legends
|-
| valign="top" |
Skyfall (Metro-Goldwyn-Mayer/Columbia Pictures)
Jack Reacher (Paramount Pictures)
Killing Them Softly (The Weinstein Company)
Looper (TriStar Pictures/FilmDistrict)
Seven Psychopaths (Momentum Pictures)

| valign="top" |
Martina Cole
Wilbur Smith
Harlan Coben
Patricia Cornwell
Frederick Forsyth
Nicci French
|-
! width="50%" | The TV Dagger
! width="50%" | The International TV Dagger
|-
| valign="top" |
Broadchurch (Kudos Film and Television for ITV)
The Bletchley Circle (World Productions for ITV)
The Fall (Artists Studio/BBC Northern Ireland for BBC Two/RTÉ One)
Luther (BBC Drama Productions for BBC One)
Top of the Lake (See-Saw Films/Screen Australia for BBC Two/BBC UKTV/Sundance Channel)

| valign="top" |
The Killing III (Arrow Films)
Arne Dahl (Filmlance International/SVT/ZDF/Filmregion Stockholm-Mälardalen/Nordisk Film)
Boardwalk Empire (season 3) (HBO)
Homeland (Teakwood Lane Productions/Showtime/Cherry Pie Productions/Keshet/Fox 21)

|-
! width="50%" | The Best Actress Dagger
! width="50%" | The Best Actor Dagger
|-
| valign="top" |
Olivia Colman for BroadchurchGillian Anderson for The Fall
Claire Danes for Homeland
Sofie Gråbøl for The Killing III
Lesley Sharp for Scott & Bailey

| valign="top" |David Tennant for BroadchurchPaddy Considine for The Suspicions of Mr Whicher: The Murder In Angel Lane
Idris Elba for Luther
Jason Isaacs for Case Histories
Damian Lewis for Homeland

|-
! width="50%" | The Best Supporting Actress Dagger
! width="50%" | The Best Supporting Actor Dagger
|-
| valign="top" |Amelia Bullmore for Scott & BaileyHolly Hunter for Top of the Lake
Pauline Quirke for Broadchurch
Jodie Whittaker for Broadchurch
Ruth Wilson for Luther

| valign="top" |Andrew Buchan for BroadchurchRoger Allam for Endeavour
Warren Brown for Luther
Paul McGann for A Mother's Son
Mandy Patinkin for Homeland

|-
! width="50%" | The CWA Ian Fleming Steel Dagger (Best Thriller)
! width="50%" | The CWA John Creasey New Blood Dagger (Best New Crime Writer)
|-
| valign="top" |Ghostman by Roger Hobbs (Transworld)
Capital Punishment by Robert Wilson (Orion)
Ratlines by Stuart Neville (Random House)
The Sentinel by Mark Oldfield (Head of Zeus)

| valign="top" |Derek B. Miller for Norwegian by Night (Faber and Faber)
The Necessary Death of Lewis Winter by Malcolm MacKay (Mantle)
Shadow of the Rock by Thomas Mogford (Bloomsbury)
Something You Are by Hanna Jameson (Head of Zeus)

|-
! width="50%" | The CWA Goldsboro Gold Dagger (Best Crime Novel)
! width="50%" | ITV3 Crime Thriller Book Club Best Read
|-
| valign="top" |Dead Lions by Mick Herron (Soho Press)
Rage Against the Dying by Becky Masterman (Orion)
Rubbernecker by Belinda Bauer (Bantam/Transworld)
The Shining Girls by Lauren Beukes (HarperCollins)

| valign="top" |The Necessary Death of Lewis Winter by Malcolm MacKay' (Mantle)Bryant & May and the Invisible Code by Christopher FowlerCity of Devils by Diana BretherickDare Me by Megan AbbottThe Scent of Death by Andrew TaylorTrust Your Eyes by Linwood Barclay
|}

 2014 ITV Specsavers awards 
Host: Bradley Walsh

 References 
"ITV Crime Thriller Awards: About the Awards. itv.com (ITV plc). Retrieved 7 October 2008.
Allen, Kate (7 September 2009). "Coben, Cole, Atkinson vie for crime awards". The Bookseller''. Retrieved 7 September 2009.
Flood, Alison (22 October 2009). "British readers vote Harlan Coben their favourite crime writer". guardian.co.uk (Guardian News & Media). Retrieved 28 October 2009.

Notes

External links 
The Crime Thriller Awards (Official website)

2008 British television series debuts
2008 establishments in the United Kingdom
Awards established in 2008
British television awards
Crime Writers' Association awards
ITV (TV network) original programming
Mystery and detective fiction awards